Al-Ahli Sports Club, is one of the oldest clubs in Jordan based in Amman, established in 1944 by a group of pioneers who helped in setting the groundwork of sport, social, and cultural life in Jordan.

History
The club was founded in 1944 under the Circassians name Koban club. The name (Al Ahli) was honorably given by the late King Abdullah Bin al Hussein I.

Stadium
Al-Ahli plays their home games at Amman International Stadium in Amman. The stadium was built on 1964 and opened on 1968, it is owned by The Jordanian government and operated by The higher council of youth. It is also the home stadium of Jordan national football team, Al-Jazeera and Al-Faisaly. It has a current capacity of 17,619 spectators.

Kits
Al-Ahli's home kit is all white shirts and white shorts, their away kit is all green shirts and shorts, while their third kit is all purple shirts and white shorts .

Kit suppliers and shirt sponsors

Honours
Source:

Domestic
Jordan League: 8
 1947, 1949, 1950, 1951, 1954, 1975, 1978, 1979

Jordan FA Cup: 1
 2015–16

Jordan Super Cup: 1
 2016

Continental
AFC Cup:
 Group stage (2017)

Current squad

Managerial history
  Issa Al-Turk
  Jamal Mahmoud
  Nihad Soufar
  Abdelrahman Idris
  Emad Khankan
  Maher Bahri

See also
 Al-Ahli SC Handball (Amman)
 Al-Ahli SC Basketball (Amman)

References

External links
Al-Ahli Club website
nationalfootballteams.com
Team details on Kooora.com
Al-Ahli SC (Amman) on Soccerway.com

Al-Ahli SC (Amman)
Football clubs in Jordan
Football clubs in Amman
Association football clubs established in 1944
1944 establishments in Transjordan
Sport in Amman